Ateshgah-e Bozorg (also Romanized as Āteshgāh-e Bozorg; also known as Ātashgāh-e Vosţá, Āteshgāh-e Vasaţ, and Āteshgāh Vasaţ) is a village in Tayebi-ye Garmsiri-ye Shomali Rural District, in the Central District of Landeh County, Kohgiluyeh and Boyer-Ahmad Province, Iran. At the 2006 census, its population was 104, in 20 families.

References 

Populated places in Landeh County